Nemanja Vlahović (born 4 January 1991) is a Montenegrin football midfielder who plays for Igalo.

Vlahović started his career with Zeta, and later played for Zabjelo, Kom and Mladost Podgorica in Montenegro, before he joined Serbian SuperLiga club OFK Beograd and signed one-year contract with that club beginning of 2016.

References

External links
 
 

1991 births
Living people
Association football midfielders
Montenegrin footballers
FK Zeta players
FK Zabjelo players
FK Kom players
OFK Titograd players
OFK Beograd players
FK Mornar players
FK Dečić players
FK Igalo 1929 players
Montenegrin First League players
Montenegrin Second League players
Serbian SuperLiga players
Montenegrin expatriate footballers
Expatriate footballers in Serbia
Montenegrin expatriate sportspeople in Serbia